Berjon may refer to:

People 
 Saúl Berjón, the Spanish footballer
 Antoine Berjon, the French painter
 Robin Berjon, the computer scientist, editor of HTML5